A one-instruction set computer (OISC), sometimes called an ultimate reduced instruction set computer (URISC), is an abstract machine that uses only one instructionobviating the need for a machine language opcode. With a judicious choice for the single instruction and given infinite resources, an OISC is capable of being a universal computer in the same manner as traditional computers that have multiple instructions. OISCs have been recommended as aids in teaching computer architecture and have been used as computational models in structural computing research. The first carbon nanotube computer is a 1-bit one-instruction set computer (and has only 178 transistors).

Machine architecture 
In a Turing-complete model, each memory location can store an arbitrary integer, anddepending on the modelthere may be arbitrarily many locations. The instructions themselves reside in memory as a sequence of such integers.

There exists a class of universal computers with a single instruction based on bit manipulation such as bit copying or bit inversion. Since their memory model is finite, as is the memory structure used in real computers, those bit manipulation machines are equivalent to real computers rather than to Turing machines.

Currently known OISCs can be roughly separated into three broad categories:

 Bit-manipulating machines
 Transport triggered architecture machines
 Arithmetic-based Turing-complete machines

Bit-manipulating machines 
Bit-manipulating machines are the simplest class.

FlipJump 
The FlipJump machine has 1 instruction, a;b - flips the bit a, then jumps to b. This is the most primitive OISC, but it's still useful. It can successfully do Math/Logic calculations, branching, pointers, and calling functions with the help of its standard library.

BitBitJump 
A bit copying machine, called BitBitJump, copies one bit in memory and passes the execution unconditionally to the address specified by one of the operands of the instruction. This process turns out to be capable of universal computation (i.e. being able to execute any algorithm and to interpret any other universal machine) because copying bits can conditionally modify the code that will be subsequently executed.

Toga computer 
Another machine, called the Toga Computer, inverts a bit and passes the execution conditionally depending on the result of inversion. The unique instruction is TOGA(a,b) which stands for TOGgle a And branch to b if the result of the toggle operation is true.

Multi-bit copying machine 
Similar to BitBitJump, a multi-bit copying machine copies several bits at the same time. The problem of computational universality is solved in this case by keeping predefined jump tables in the memory.

Transport triggered architecture 
Transport triggered architecture (TTA) is a design in which computation is a side effect of data transport. Usually, some memory registers (triggering ports) within common address space perform an assigned operation when the instruction references them. For example, in an OISC using a single memory-to-memory copy instruction, this is done by triggering ports that perform arithmetic and instruction pointer jumps when written to.

Arithmetic-based Turing-complete machines 
Arithmetic-based Turing-complete machines use an arithmetic operation and a conditional jump. Like the two previous universal computers, this class is also Turing-complete. The instruction operates on integers which may also be addresses in memory.

Currently there are several known OISCs of this class, based on different arithmetic operations:

 addition (addleq, add and branch if less than or equal to zero)
 decrement (DJN, Decrement and branch (Jump) if Nonzero)
 increment (P1eq, Plus 1 and branch if equal to another value)
 subtraction (subleq, subtract and branch if less than or equal to zero)
 positive subtraction when possible, else branch (Arithmetic machine)

Instruction types 
Common choices for the single instruction are:

 Subtract and branch if less than or equal to zero
 Subtract and branch if negative
 Subtract if positive else branch
 Reverse subtract and skip if borrow
 Move (used as part of a transport triggered architecture)

 Subtract and branch if non zero (SBNZ a, b, c, destination)
 Cryptoleq (heterogeneous encrypted and unencrypted computation)

Only one of these instructions is used in a given implementation. Hence, there is no need for an opcode to identify which instruction to execute; the choice of instruction is inherent in the design of the machine, and an OISC is typically named after the instruction it uses (e.g., an SBN OISC, the SUBLEQ language, etc.). Each of the above instructions can be used to construct a Turing-complete OISC.

This article presents only subtraction-based instructions among those that are not transport triggered. However, it is possible to construct Turing complete machines using an instruction based on other arithmetic operations, e.g., addition. For example, one variation known as DLN (Decrement and jump if not zero) has only two operands and uses decrement as the base operation. For more information see Subleq derivative languages .

Subtract and branch if not equal to zero 
The SBNZ a, b, c, d  instruction ("subtract and branch if not equal to zero") subtracts the contents at address a from the contents at address b, stores the result at address c, and then, if the result is not 0, transfers control to address d (if the result is equal to zero, execution proceeds to the next instruction in sequence).

Subtract and branch if less than or equal to zero 
The  instruction ("subtract and branch if less than or equal to zero") subtracts the contents at address  from the contents at address , stores the result at address , and then, if the result is not positive, transfers control to address  (if the result is positive, execution proceeds to the next instruction in sequence). Pseudocode:

 Instruction subleq a, b, c
     Mem[b] = Mem[b] - Mem[a]
     if (Mem[b] ≤ 0)
         goto c

Conditional branching can be suppressed by setting the third operand equal to the address of the next instruction in sequence.  If the third operand is not written, this suppression is implied.

A variant is also possible with two operands and an internal accumulator, where the accumulator is subtracted from the memory location specified by the first operand. The result is stored in both the accumulator and the memory location, and the second operand specifies the branch address:

 Instruction subleq2 a, b
     Mem[a] = Mem[a] - ACCUM
     ACCUM = Mem[a]
     if (Mem[a] ≤ 0)
         goto b

Although this uses only two (instead of three) operands per instruction, correspondingly more instructions are then needed to effect various logical operations.

Synthesized instructions 
It is possible to synthesize many types of higher-order instructions using only the  instruction.

Unconditional branch:

  subleq Z, Z, c

Addition can be performed by repeated subtraction, with no conditional branching; e.g., the following instructions result in the content at location  being added to the content at location :

  subleq a, Z
  subleq Z, b
  subleq Z, Z

The first instruction subtracts the content at location  from the content at location  (which is 0) and stores the result (which is the negative of the content at ) in location .

A copy instruction can be implemented similarly; e.g., the following instructions result in the content at location  getting replaced by the content at location , again assuming the content at location  is maintained as 0:

  subleq b, b
  subleq a, Z
  subleq Z, b
  subleq Z, Z

Any desired arithmetic test can be built.  For example, a branch-if-zero condition can be assembled from the following instructions:

  subleq b, Z, L1
  subleq Z, Z, OUT
L1:
  subleq Z, Z
  subleq Z, b, c
OUT:
  ...

Subleq2 can also be used to synthesize higher-order instructions, although it generally requires more operations for a given task. For example, no fewer than 10 subleq2 instructions are required to flip all the bits in a given byte:

  subleq2 tmp          ; tmp = 0 (tmp = temporary register)
  subleq2 tmp
  subleq2 one          ; acc = -1
  subleq2 Z            ; Z = - a - 1
  subleq2 tmp          ; tmp = a + 1
  subleq2 tmp          ; load tmp into acc
  subleq2 Z            ; set Z back to 0

Emulation 
The following program (written in pseudocode) emulates the execution of a -based OISC:

 int memory[], program_counter, a, b, c
 program_counter = 0
 while (program_counter >= 0):
     a = memory[program_counter]
     b = memory[program_counter+1]
     c = memory[program_counter+2]
     if (a < 0 or b < 0):
         program_counter = -1
     else:
         memory[b] = memory[b] - memory[a]
         if (memory[b] > 0):
             program_counter += 3
         else:
             program_counter = c

This program assumes that  is indexed by nonnegative integers. Similar interpreters written in a -based language (i.e., self-interpreters, which may use self-modifying code as allowed by the nature of the  instruction) can be found in the external links below.

A general purpose SMP-capable 64-bit operating system called Dawn OS has been implemented in an emulated Subleq machine. The OS contains a C-like compiler. Some memory areas in the virtual machine are used for peripherals like the keyboard, mouse, hard drives, network card, etc. Basic applications written for it include a media player, painting tool, document reader and scientific calculator.

A 32-bit Subleq computer with a graphic display and a keyboard called Izhora has been constructed by Yoel Matveyev as a large cellular automation pattern.

Compilation 
There is a compiler called Higher Subleq written by Oleg Mazonka that compiles a simplified C program into  code.

Subtract and branch if negative 
The  instruction ("subtract and branch if negative"), also called , is defined similarly to :

 Instruction subneg a, b, c
     Mem[b] = Mem[b] - Mem[a]
     if (Mem[b] < 0)
         goto c

Conditional branching can be suppressed by setting the third operand equal to the address of the next instruction in sequence.  If the third operand is not written, this suppression is implied.

Synthesized instructions 
It is possible to synthesize many types of higher-order instructions using only the  instruction.

Unconditional branch:

  subneg POS, Z, c

Unconditional branching is assured only if  initially contains 0 (or a value less than the integer stored in ). A follow-up instruction is required to clear  after the branching, assuming that the content of  must be maintained as 0.

subneg4 
A variant is also possible with four operands – subneg4.  The reversal of minuend and subtrahend eases implementation in hardware.  The non-destructive result simplifies the synthetic instructions.

 Instruction subneg s, m, r, j
     (* subtrahend, minuend, result and jump addresses *)
     Mem[r] = Mem[m] - Mem[s]
     if (Mem[r] < 0)
         goto j

Arithmetic machine 
In an attempt to make Turing machine more intuitive, Z. A. Melzak consider the task of computing with positive numbers. The machine has an infinite abacus, an infinite number of counters (pebbles, tally sticks) initially at a special location S. The machine is able to do one operation: 
Take from location X as many counters as there are in location Y and transfer them to location Z and proceed to instruction y.

If this operation is not possible because there is not enough counters in Y, then leave the abacus as it is and proceed to instruction n. 
In order to keep all numbers positive and mimic a human operator computing on a real world abacus, the test is performed before any subtraction. Pseudocode:

 Instruction melzak X, Y, Z, n, y
     if (Mem[Y] < Mem[X])
         goto n
     Mem[X] -= Mem[Y]
     Mem[Z] += Mem[Y]
     goto y

After giving a few programs: multiplication, gcd, computing the n-th prime number, representation in base b of an arbitrary number, sorting in order of magnitude, Melzak shows explicitly how to simulate an arbitrary Turing machine on his arithmetic machine.

multiply:
  melzak P, ONE, S, stop                ; Move 1 counter from P to S. If not possible, move to stop.
  melzak S, Q, ANS, multiply, multiply  ; Move q counters from S to ANS. Move to the first instruction.
stop:
where the memory location P is p, Q is q, ONE is 1, ANS is initially 0 and at the end pq, and S is a large number. 

He mentions that it can easily be shown using the elements of recursive functions that every number calculable on the arithmetic machine is computable. A proof of which was given by Lambek on an equivalent two instruction machine : X+ (increment X) and X− else T (decrement X if it not empty, else jump to T).

Reverse subtract and skip if  borrow 
In a reverse subtract and skip if borrow (RSSB) instruction, the accumulator is subtracted from the memory location and the next instruction is skipped if there was a borrow (memory location was smaller than the accumulator). The result is stored in both the accumulator and the memory location. The program counter is mapped to memory location 0. The accumulator is mapped to memory location 1.

 Instruction rssb x
     ACCUM = Mem[x] - ACCUM
     Mem[x] = ACCUM
     if (ACCUM < 0)
         goto PC + 2

Example 
To set x to the value of y minus z:

# First, move z to the destination location x.
  RSSB temp # Three instructions required to clear acc, temp [See Note 1]
  RSSB temp
  RSSB temp
  RSSB x    # Two instructions clear acc, x, since acc is already clear
  RSSB x
  RSSB y    # Load y into acc: no borrow
  RSSB temp # Store -y into acc, temp: always borrow and skip
  RSSB temp # Skipped
  RSSB x    # Store y into x, acc
# Second, perform the operation.
  RSSB temp # Three instructions required to clear acc, temp
  RSSB temp
  RSSB temp
  RSSB z    # Load z
  RSSB x    # x = y - z [See Note 2]
 [Note 1] If the value stored at "temp" is initially a negative value and the instruction that executed right before the first "RSSB temp" in this routine borrowed, then four "RSSB temp" instructions will be required for the routine to work.
 [Note 2] If the value stored at "z" is initially a negative value then the final "RSSB x" will be skipped and thus the routine will not work.

Transport triggered architecture 

A transport triggered architecture uses only the move instruction, hence it was originally called a "move machine". This instruction moves the contents of one memory location to another memory location combining with the current content of the new location:

 Instruction movx a, b (also written a -> b)
     OP = GetOperation(Mem[b])
     Mem[b] := OP(Mem[a], Mem[b])

The operation performed is defined by the destination memory cell. Some cells are specialized in addition, some other in multiplication, etc. So memory cells are not simple store but coupled with an arithmetic logic unit (ALU) setup to perform only one sort of operation with the current value of the cell. Some of the cells are control flow instructions to alter the program execution with jumps, conditional execution, subroutines, if-then-else, for-loop, etc...

A commercial transport triggered architecture microcontroller has been produced called MAXQ, which hides the apparent inconvenience of an OISC by using a "transfer map" that represents all possible destinations for the move instructions.

Cryptoleq 

Cryptoleq is a language consisting of one eponymous instruction, is capable of performing general-purpose computation on encrypted programs and is a close relative to Subleq.

 Instruction cryptoleq a, b, c
     Mem[b] = O1(Mem[a], Mem[b])
     if O2(Mem[b]) ≤ 0
         IP = c
     else
         IP = IP + 3

where a, b and c are addressed by the instruction pointer, IP, with the value of IP addressing a, IP + 1 point to b and IP + 2 to c.

Cryptoleq is also homomorphic to Subleq, modular inversion and multiplication is homomorphic to subtraction and the operation of  corresponds the Subleq test if the values were unencrypted. A program written in Subleq can run on a Cryptoleq machine, meaning backwards compatibility. Cryptoleq though, implements fully homomorphic calculations and since the model is be able to do multiplications. Multiplication on an encrypted domain is assisted by a unique function G that is assumed to be difficult to reverse engineer and allows re-encryption of a value based on the  operation:

The multiplication algorithm is based on addition and subtraction, uses the function G and does not have conditional jumps nor branches. Cryptoleq encryption is based on Paillier cryptosystem.

See also 
 FRACTRAN
 Minimal axioms for Boolean algebra
 Register machine
 Turing tarpit
 Reduced instruction set computer
 Complex instruction set computer
 Zero instruction set computer

References

External links 

 Subleq on the esoteric programming languages wiki – interpreters, compilers, examples and derivative languages
  by Christopher Domas
 Laboratory subleq computer – FPGA implementation using VHDL
 The Retrocomputing Museum – SBN emulator and sample programs
 Laboratory SBN computer – implemented with 7400 series integrated circuits
 RSSB on the esoteric programming languages wiki – interpreters and examples
 Dr. Dobb's 32-bit OISC implementation – transport triggered architecture (TTA) on an FPGA using Verilog
 Introduction to the MAXQ Architecture – includes transfer map diagram
 OISC-Emulator – graphical version
 TrapCC (recent Intel x86 MMUs are actually Turing-complete OISCs.)
 Izhora – Yoel Matveyev's Subleq computer built as a cellular automation
 SBN simulator – simulator and design inspired by CARDboard Illustrative Aid to Computation
 One-bit Computing at 60 Hertz – intermediate between a computer and a state machine
 The NOR Machineinfo on building a CPU with only one Instruction
 CryptoleqCryptoleq resources repository
 CAAMPComputer Architecture A Minimalist Perspective
 SICO – Single Instruction COmputer: a variant of SUBLEQ using unsigned integers

Models of computation
Esoteric programming languages